Sumpfsee is a lake in the Rostock district in Mecklenburg-Vorpommern, Germany. At an elevation of 6 m, its surface area is 1.27 km².

Lakes of Mecklenburg-Western Pomerania